Aaron's sign is a referred pain felt in the epigastrium upon continuous firm pressure over McBurney's point. It is one of the best known signs of appendicitis, although it is rarely referred to by its name. While the sign is well known, and taught in medical education, its efficacy has not been well established

Aaron's sign is named for Charles Dettie Aaron, an American gastroenterologist.

References

Medical signs